Drupadia theda nobumasai  is a subspecies of butterfly in the family Lycaenidae. It is found in Indonesia (Simeulue).

References

 Hayashi Hisakazu, 1984: New Synonyms, New Status, New Combinations, New Species and New Subspecies of Butterflies from the Philippines and Indonesia (Lepidoptera: Satyridae, Riodinidae, Lycaenidae). IWASE.2:9-34.

Butterflies described in 1984
theda nobumasai
Butterfly subspecies